Guga Palavandishvili (born 14 August 1993) is a Georgian professional footballer who plays as a midfielder for Erovnuli Liga club Dinamo Batumi.

Career

International career
Palavandishvili made his international debut for Georgia on 8 October 2015 in a 4:0 win against Gibraltar in the Euro 2016 qualifiers.

References

External links
 

Living people
1993 births
Association football midfielders
Footballers from Georgia (country)
Footballers from Tbilisi
FC Gagra players
FC Dila Gori players
FC Torpedo Kutaisi players
FC Dacia Chișinău players
Podbeskidzie Bielsko-Biała players
FK Ventspils players
PAS Lamia 1964 players
FC Dinamo Batumi players
Erovnuli Liga players
Moldovan Super Liga players
I liga players
Latvian Higher League players
Super League Greece players
Expatriate footballers from Georgia (country)
Expatriate footballers in Moldova
Expatriate footballers in Poland
Expatriate footballers in Latvia
Expatriate footballers in Greece
Expatriate sportspeople from Georgia (country) in Moldova
Expatriate sportspeople from Georgia (country) in Poland
Expatriate sportspeople from Georgia (country) in Latvia
Expatriate sportspeople from Georgia (country) in Greece
Georgia (country) international footballers